Graeme Charles Arthur Wood (born August 21, 1979, in Polk County, Minnesota) is an American staff writer for The Atlantic. Prior to that he was a contributing editor there
and has written for The New Yorker, The American Scholar, The New Republic,  Bloomberg Businessweek, Culture+Travel, The Wall Street Journal and the International Herald Tribune.  Wood works also as a lecturer in political science at Yale University.

Wood was born in Polk County, Minnesota. He grew up in Dallas and graduated from St. Mark's School of Texas in 1997. He spent a year studying Arabic Language at American University in Cairo, and also studied central Asian languages at Indiana University and Deep Springs College before transferring to Harvard College to study African-American Studies and Philosophy graduating in 2001.

In 2017, he won the Canadian Governor General's Award for English-language non-fiction, which he was eligible for due to holding Canadian citizenship, for his book The Way of the Strangers: Encounters with the Islamic State.

References

External links
 
 The New Republic author page
 The Atlantic author page

1979 births
Living people
American war correspondents
Deep Springs College alumni
Governor General's Award-winning non-fiction writers
Harvard College alumni
Journalists from Dallas
People from Polk County, Minnesota
The Atlantic (magazine) people
The New Republic people
Yale University faculty
St. Mark's School (Texas) alumni
American people of Asian descent
Writers from Texas
21st-century American journalists